The 2016–17 Coupe de France preliminary rounds, Alsace, Lorraine and Champagne-Ardenne made up the qualifying competition to decide which teams from the Alsace, Lorraine and Champagne-Ardenne leagues took part in the main competition from round 7. This was the 100th season of the most prestigious football cup competition of France. The competition was organised by the French Football Federation (FFF) and is open to all clubs in French football, as well as clubs from the overseas departments and territories (Guadeloupe, French Guiana, Martinique, Mayotte, New Caledonia (qualification via 2016 New Caledonia Cup), Tahiti (qualification via 2016 Tahiti Cup), Réunion, and Saint Martin).

The qualifying rounds took place between April and October 2016.

First round

First round (Alsace)

First round (Lorraine)

First round (Champagne-Ardenne)

Second round

Second round (Alsace)
These matches were played between 21 and 31 August 2016.

Second round results: Alsace

Second round (Lorraine)
These matches were played between 21 and 24 August 2016.

Second round results: Lorraine

Second round (Champagne-Ardenne)
These matches were played on 28 August 2016.

Second round results: Champagne-Ardenne

Third round

Third round (Alsace)
These matches were played on 10 and 11 September 2016.

Third round results: Alsace

Third round (Lorraine)
These matches were played on 10 and 11 September 2016.

Third round results: Lorraine

Third round (Champagne-Ardenne)
These matches were played on 10 and 11 September 2016.

Third round results: Champagne-Ardenne

Fourth round

Fourth round (Alsace)
These matches were played on 24 and 25 September 2016.

Fourth round results: Alsace

Fourth round (Lorraine)
These matches were played on 24 and 25 September 2016.

Fourth round results: Lorraine

Fourth round (Champagne-Ardenne)
These matches were played on 25 September 2016.

Fourth round results: Champagne-Ardenne

Fifth round

Fifth round (Alsace)
These matches were played on 7, 8 and 9 October 2016.

Fifth round results: Alsace

Fifth round (Lorraine)
These matches were played on 8 and 9 October 2016.

Fifth round results: Lorraine

Fifth round (Champagne-Ardenne)
These matches were played on 8 and 9 October 2016.

Fifth round results: Champagne-Ardenne

References

Preliminary rounds